José Gaspar da Silva Azevedo (born 1 June 1975), known simply as Gaspar, is a Portuguese retired professional footballer who played as a central defender.

Club career
Gaspar was born in Santo Tirso, Porto District. During the vast majority of his career, he rarely spent more than one season with the same club. He represented C.D. Trofense, F.C. Tirsense (where he made his Primeira Liga debut), Vitória de Setúbal, FC Porto (which were crowned league champions at the end of the 1997–98 campaign, but he was only fourth of fifth choice in his position), Leça FC – in a brief return to the Segunda Liga – F.C. Alverca (he represented the Lisbon side on two occasions), F.C. Paços de Ferreira and Gil Vicente FC.

In the 2004–05 campaign, Gaspar played for AC Ajaccio in France, appearing in 16 Ligue 1 matches, then switched back to his country with C.F. Os Belenenses. At the age of already 32 he would settle at Rio Ave F.C., helping the Vila do Conde team return to the top division in his first season while adding a round-of-16 presence in the Taça de Portugal.

From 2008 to 2011, Gaspar only missed five league matches for Rio Ave, also netting three goals as the club consecutively managed to retain its league status. In July 2012, having made a total of 322 appearances in the Portuguese top tier (19 goals), he signed for one year with S.C. Covilhã of division two.

Post-retirement
After retiring, Gaspar worked in precision metalworking.

Honours
Porto
Primeira Liga: 1997–98
Taça de Portugal: 1997–98

References

External links

1975 births
Living people
People from Santo Tirso
Sportspeople from Porto District
Portuguese footballers
Association football defenders
Primeira Liga players
Liga Portugal 2 players
Segunda Divisão players
C.D. Trofense players
F.C. Tirsense players
Vitória F.C. players
FC Porto players
Leça F.C. players
F.C. Alverca players
F.C. Paços de Ferreira players
Gil Vicente F.C. players
C.F. Os Belenenses players
Rio Ave F.C. players
S.C. Covilhã players
Varzim S.C. players
Ligue 1 players
AC Ajaccio players
Portugal under-21 international footballers
Portuguese expatriate footballers
Expatriate footballers in France
Portuguese expatriate sportspeople in France